Elysia timida is a species of sacoglossan sea slug, a marine opisthobranch gastropod mollusk. Found in the Mediterranean and nearby parts of the Atlantic, it is herbivorous, feeding on various algae in shallow water.

Description
The head bears a pair of long, smooth rhinophores, at the base of which are a pair of black eyespots. The broad foot widens into two lobed parapodia which can fold up over the back. The colour is mainly white with widely scattered red or orange spots, but the dorsal surface of the body, and the inner surface of the parapodia, are some shade of mid- to dark green. When the animal has been living in a habitat with Lithophyllum or other pink calcareous algae, the white colour may be tinged with mauve.

Distribution
This marine species used to be considered endemic to the Mediterranean Sea,  but has also been found in the Atlantic Ocean, off the Cape Verde and Canary Islands, and possibly in the Caribbean Sea.

Feeding habits
Elysia timida feeds on the alga Acetabularia acetabulum in spring and summer,  and on Padina pavonica in autumn. It is able to make use of the chloroplasts from the algae, storing them in outgrowths of its digestive gland, where they give the sea slug its green colour. This is called kleptoplasty. The chloroplasts are able to continue photosynthesising in the slug's tissues for about 45 days, and contributing to the slug's nutritional requirements. The slug is able to regulate the process, folding its parapodia over its back to restrict the amount of light the chloroplasts receive, or unfolding its parapodia to allow the chloroplasts full access to the light.

Reproduction
Elysia timida is a hermaphrodite and two individuals come together and mate simultaneously. With their right sides in close proximity,  each uses its long penis to insert sperm into the tissues of the other. They then separate and loop round to rearrange themselves, this time depositing sperm into the recipient's genital opening. This second mating phase is sometimes omitted. The eggs are laid in the spring in a white spiral coil about a centimetre across.

References

External links 

 Risso A., 1818: Mémoire sur quelques Gastropodes nouveaux, Nudibranches et Tectibranches observés dans la mer de Nice; Journal de Physique, de Chimie, d'Histoire Naturelle et des Arts 87: 368–377.
 Gofas, S.; Le Renard, J.; Bouchet, P. (2001). Mollusca. in: Costello, M.J. et al. (Ed.) (2001). European register of marine species: a check-list of the marine species in Europe and a bibliography of guides to their identification. Collection Patrimoines Naturels. 50: pp. 180–213.
 Marin A. & Ros J., 1993: Ultrastructural and ecological aspects of the development of chloroplast retention in the Sacoglossan Gastropod Elysia timida; Journal of Molluscan Studies 59(1): 95–104. .
 Schmitt V., et al. (2014). Chloroplast incorporation and long-term photosynthetic performance through the life cycle in laboratory cultures of Elysia timida (Sacoglossa, Heterobranchia). Frontiers in Zoology 11:5. .
 

Plakobranchidae
Molluscs of the Atlantic Ocean
Molluscs of the Mediterranean Sea
Gastropods of Cape Verde
Gastropods described in 1818
Taxa named by Antoine Risso